The West Virginia Mountaineers college football team represents West Virginia University in the Big 12 Conference (Big 12). The Mountaineers competes as part of the NCAA Division I Football Bowl Subdivision. The program has had 35 head coaches since it began play during the 1891 season. Since January 2019, Neal Brown has served as West Virginia's head coach.

Through the end of the 2022 season, the Mountaineers have competed in 1,336 games and compiled an overall record of 771 wins, 520 losses, and 46 ties. In that time, 12 coaches have led the Mountaineers in postseason bowl games: Clarence Spears, Marshall Glenn, Dudley DeGroot, Art Lewis, Gene Corum, Jim Carlen, Bobby Bowden, Don Nehlen, Rich Rodriguez, Bill Stewart, Dana Holgorsen, and Brown. Seven of those coaches also won conference championships: Lewis captured five, Corum two, and Carlen one as a member of the Southern Conference; Rodriguez captured four and Nehlen, Stewart, and Holgorsen each captured one as a member of the Big East Conference.

Nehlen is the leader in seasons coached and games won, with 149 victories during his 21 years with the program. Harry E. Trout has the highest winning percentage of those who have coached more than one game, with .857. Thomas Trenchard has the lowest winning percentage of those who have coached more than one game, with .333. Of the 35 different head coaches who have led the Mountaineers, Spears, Ira Rodgers, Greasy Neale, Bowden, and Nehlen have been inducted into the College Football Hall of Fame.

Key

Coaches

Notes

References

West Virginia Mountaineers

West Virginia Mountaineers football coaches